Leatherwood is a surname. Notable people with the surname include:

Alex Leatherwood (born 1998), American football player
Elmer O. Leatherwood (1872–1929), American politician
Gavin Leatherwood (born 1994), American actor & singer
Frank Leatherwood (born 1977), American football player
Lillie Leatherwood (born 1964), American athlete
Ray Leatherwood (1914–1996), American jazz double-bassist
Robert N. Leatherwood (1844–1920), American businessman
Tom Leatherwood (born 1956), American politician
Randy Leatherwood (born 1994), American businessman

English-language surnames